Scrobipalpa libanonica is a moth in the family Gelechiidae. It was described by Povolný in 1966. It is found in Lebanon.

The forewings are covered with mixed whitish grey-tipped scales. The hindwings are silvery grey-whitish.

References

Scrobipalpa
Moths described in 1966